Jonathan Birch (born 15 February 1968) is an English former professional snooker player.

Career

Born in 1968, Birch turned professional in 1990, and his first season was a successful one; he reached the last 16 of several tournaments, including the 1991 World Masters, where he was defeated 4–7 by Steve Longworth.

He was unable to repeat this good form until 1993, when he reached the quarter-final of the 1993 Dubai Classic; there, he beat Mike Hallett, Dennis Taylor and Terry Griffiths en route to being whitewashed 0–5 by Stephen Hendry. Birch's performances were inconsistent, but such inconsistency was enough to warrant his position as a middle-ranked 'journeyman' player; he appeared in the last 16 at the 1997 European Open in 1996–97, where again, he lost to Hendry, this time 5–3. At the end of the next season, he reached his career-highest ranking of 42nd.

In the 1997 Benson & Hedges Championship, Birch played Mark Fenton in the last 128, compiling three century breaks in five frames as he beat the Welshman 5–4; Birch would progress to the quarter-final, where he lost 1–5 to another Welshman, Paul Davies.

He defeated a declining Steve Davis 5–2 en route to losing to Ali Carter by the same scoreline in the last 32 of the 1999 Grand Prix; Birch had made a 52 break in the final frame against Carter but lost it 59–69.

Birch maintained sufficient form to hold a position within the top 50 in the rankings until 2003, but slipped to 64th at the end of the 2003/2004 season, and after dropping a further twenty places to 84th during the next, was relegated from the tour in 2005, aged 37.

References

English snooker players
1968 births
Living people